The Chilean honours system provides a means for the Government of Chile to reward gallantry, achievement, or service, by both Chileans and non-citizens. The honours system consists of three types of award: orders, decorations and medals. Membership of an Order (in one of its various grades) is conferred to recognise merit in terms of achievement and service. Decorations are conferred to recognise specific deeds of gallantry, bravery, distinguished or meritorious service. Medals are conferred to recognise long and/or valuable service and/or good conduct. Awards to non-citizens are usually only made where the gallantry, achievement or service has advanced Chilean interests in some way. The honours conferred by the Chilean Republic can be divided into two groups: civil and military. Military honours are conferred by the different branches of the Armed Forces of Chile. Civil honours are conferred by the President of Chile or, in some instances, by the government minister relevant to the particular honour.

Civil orders

Order of Merit
()

The Order of Merit of Chile was established in 1906, as a successor order to the Legion of Merit, to 'reward outstanding civil service to the Republic of Chile provided by foreign nationals'. The order is governed by the Council of the Order of Merit of Chile. The President of Chile is the Chair of the council. The remaining councilors comprise the Minister of Foreign Affairs (Chancellor of the Order), the Secretary of Foreign Affairs, the Director General Foreign Policy and the Director General Ceremonial and Protocol (Secretary of the Order) while the Deputy Director Protocol serves as the Secretary of the Order. The order consists of five classes:
  Collar, I* Class
  Grand Cross, I Class
  Grand Officer, II Class
  Commander, III Class
  Officer, IV Class
  Knight, V Class

Order of Bernardo O'Higgins

The Order of Bernado O'Higgins was established in 1956 as an extension of the Order of Merit of Chile in order to recognise foreign nationals for their 'outstanding contribution to the arts, sciences, education, industry, trade or social and humanitarian cooperation'. The Order of Bernardo O'Higgins is conferred by the Chilean President on the advice of the Minister of Foreign Relations. The order was originally established in two classes:
  Bernardo O'Higgins Medal, I Class
  Bernardo O'Higgins Medal, II Class
In 1967 the order was reorganised into five classes, and after modifications in 1985 and 2006, it acquired the same grades as the Order of Merit:
  Collar, I* Class
  Grand Cross, I Class
  Grand Officer, II Class
  Commander, III Class
  Officer, IV Class
  Knight, V Class

Gabriela Mistral Order of Educational and Cultural Merit

The Order of Gabriela Mistral was established in 1977 and is conferred by the Minister of Education to Chileans and to foreign nationals who have 'made an outstanding contribution benefiting education, culture and the advancement of teaching'. When presented outside of Chile, installation is usually performed at the Chilean embassy, legation or consulate by the highest Chilean representative present or personally by the Minister of Education. The order consists of a single class.

Meritorious Service to the Republic

The decoration for Meritorious Service to the Republic was established as an order, in 1985, to recognise Chilean citizens for 'services of special importance for the country'. Membership of the Order is conferred by the President of the Republic upon the recommendation of a Council composed of the Ministers of the Interior, Foreign Affairs, Defence, Justice and the Secretary General of the Presidency. The council is also responsible for the order's registry. The order is established in five classes:
 Grand Star in Gold, I Class
 Grand Officer, II Class
 Commander, III Class
 Silver Star with Golden Laurel, IV Class
 Knight, V Class
 Silver Star, VI Class

Order of Naval Merit

The Order of Naval Merit was established in three classes:
 Commander, I Class
 Officer, II Class
 Knight, III Class

Decorations

President of the Republic decoration

The decoration of the President of the Republic was established as an order in four classes:

 Grand Cross´s Collar, I Class
   Grand Officer, II Class
 Officer, III Class
 Knight, IV Class

Decorations for gallantry

Decoration of Valour

Medal of Valour

Decorations for distinguished service

Victory Cross decoration

The Victory Cross decoration is established in two grades:
 Grand Victory Cross
 Victory Cross

Decoration of Honour for Distinguished Service

 Grand Star of Honour (Army)
 Grand Star of Merit (Army)
 Grand Star (Army)
 Star (Army)
 Grand Star of Merit (Air Force)
 Grand Star (Air Force)
 Star (Air Force)
 Grand Star of Merit (Police)
 Grand Star (Police)
 Star (Police)

Distinguished Service Decoration 

The Distinguished Service Decoration is conferred in separate versions for each of the Army, Navy, Air Force and Police Force. The decoration is established in three classes:
 I Class
 II Class
 III Class

Decorations for meritorious service

Cross of Aeronautical Merit

The Cross of Aeronautical Merit is established in five classes:
  Grand Cross of Aeronautical Merit, I Class
 Cross of Aeronautical Merit, II Class
 Distinguished Flying Cross, III Class
 Distinguished Service Cross, IV Class
 Bar of Honour, V Class

Cross of the Army Bicentenary
The Cross of the Army Bicentenary was established by President of the Republic of Chile, Sebastián Piñera Echenique, in 2010 to commemorate the bicentenary of the Chilean Army (which was established on 2 December 1810). It is conferred by the Commander-in-Chief of the Army to recognise representatives of organisations that have significantly supported the endeavours of the Army. The decoration has been established in two grades:
 Grand Cross of the Army Bicentenary - the badge of a Grand Cross is worn on a broad scarlet sash hung across the body from the right shoulder.
 Cross of the Army Bicentenary - this grade uses a neck badge suspended from a scarlet ribbon.
Notable recipients of the Grand Cross of the Army Bicentenary include President Piñera and the Virgin of Carmen at the Metropolitan Cathedral of Santiago. Notable Chilean recipients of the Cross of the Army Bicentenary include the Commander-in-Chief of the Navy, Admiral Edmundo Gonzalez, the Commander-in-Chief of the Air Force, Air Force General Jorge Rojas Avila, the Director General of the Carabineros, General Manager Gustavo González Jure, and the Director General of Investigations Police, Marcos Antonio Vásquez Meza.

Medal of Diplomatic Merit

The Medal of Diplomatic Merit was established to recognise selected officials of the foreign service branch of the Chilean Ministry of Foreign Affairs, for long and meritorious service on behalf of Chile.

Medal of Functionary Merit

The Medal of Functionary Merit was established to recognise selected officials (functionaries) of the Management and Professional branches of the Chilean Ministry of Foreign Affairs of Chile, for long and meritorious service on behalf of Chile.

Military Works Corps Star of Honour and Merit

Decorations for long and meritorious Service

Decoration for Great Military Merit of the Chilean Air Force

Military Star

Medals

Commemorative medals
Fiftieth Anniversary of the Chilean Air Force Commemorative Medal

Long service awards

 30 Years Service award

 20 Years Service award

 10 Years Service award

 30 Years of Police Service Medal

 20 Years of Police Service Medal

Service school medals

 Military School of the Liberator General Bernardo O'Higgins Gold Medal

 Minerva Medal (Army War College)

 Minerva Medal (Air Force War College)

 General Carlos Ibáñez del Campo Police School Medal

 Second Sergeant Daniel Rebolledo Sepúlveda NCO School Medal

Service Medal of the Ministry of National Defense

Service medals
Service Medal of the Honourable Board of the Government

Mission Accomplished

18 September Medal

Obsolete

Legion of Merit

The Legion of Merit of Chile was established on 1 June 1817 by the Supreme Director of the newly independent Chile, Liberator General Bernardo O'Higgins, to reward civil and military service to the nation and, at the time, was the most senior honour of Chile. The Head of State was established as the head of the Legion. However, after O'Higgins resigned in January 1823, the President of the Regency Council, José Miguel Infante, effectively abolished the order in June 1825. The order was established in four classes:
 Grand Officers of the Legion, I Class
 Officers of the Legion, II Class
 Sub-Officers of the Legion, III Class
 Legionnaires or Members of the Legion, IV Class

References

Further reading

 
  Decree No 244/74 Regulations of the Order of the Southern Cross.
  TM-033 Uniform Regulations for Officers of National Merchant Marine Vessels.
 
  Provides intermittent updates on awards to notable non-Chileans.
  Regulations for the Granting and Use of the Decorations, Medals and Distinctions in the Forces of Order and Public Safety, No 18.
  Good selection of images